Ives, Songs is a ballet made by New York City Ballet ballet master Jerome Robbins to songs of Charles Ives:

 "The Children's Hour"
 "Memories, Part A: Very Pleasant"
 "Waltz"
 "The Cage"
 "The See'r"
 "Two Little Flowers" 
 "At the River and Serenity"
 "He is There"
 "Tom Sails Away" 
 "White Gulls"
 "Songs My Mother Taught Me"
 "There is a Lane"
 "In Summer Fields"
 from the "Incantation"
 "Autumn"
 "Like a Sick Eagle"
 "Elegie"

 
The premiere took place on February 4, 1988 at the New York State Theater, Lincoln Center, with scenery by David Mitchell, costumes by Florence Klotz and lighting by Jennifer Tipton. The singer was Timothy Nolen and the pianist Gordon Boelzner. Other works to the music of Ives in the City Ballet  repertory include Peter Martins' Calcium Light Night, George Balanchine's Ivesiana and Eliot Feld's The Unanswered Question.

Original cast

Maria Calegari
Stacy Caddell
Katrina Killian
Margaret Tracey
Lauren Hauser
Melinda Roy
Lisa Jackson
Florence Fitzgerald
Stephanie Saland
Alexandre Proia
Jeppe Mydtskov
Laurence Matthews
Michael Byars
Tom Gold
Robert Lyon
Damian Woetzel
Philip Neal
Jeffrey Edwards
Otto Neubert

Footnotes

References 
 Repertory Week, New York City Ballet, Spring Season, 2008 repertory, week 5
 Playbill, New York City Ballet, Friday, May 30, 2008

Articles

Reviews 
  
NY Times, Anna Kisselgoff, February 6, 1988 
NY Times, Jennifer Dunning, February 11, 2008

NY Times review by Roslyn Sulcas, May 29, 2008

Ballets by Jerome Robbins
Ballets to the music of Charles Ives
Ballets designed by David Mitchell
Ballets designed by Florence Klotz
Ballets designed by Jennifer Tipton
1988 ballet premieres
New York City Ballet repertory